Eucamptognathus griveaudi is a species of ground beetle in the subfamily Pterostichinae. It was described by Basilewsky in 1967.

References

Eucamptognathus
Beetles described in 1967